North Holmwood is a residential area on the outskirts of Dorking, in Surrey, England. The village is accessible from the A24, the village's historic heart is the road Spook Hill. The 2011 census for the broader area Holmwoods shows a population of 6,417 and that North Holmwood forms part of the Dorking Built-up Area.

The village 
The village has a main street called Spook Hill, in which there is a newsagent's shop. There are other main built up roads:  Bentsbrook Road, Bentsbrook Park (no through roads) and Holmesdale Road leading to Inholms Lane, completing a circuit, and smaller roads and estates such as St John's, making the village larger than it first appears.  The residential area of Stonebridge in the east is linked by residential roads to Spook Hill, as is Chart Downs across Bent's Brook. There is a village hall, a clinic called Holmwood Surgery and a local sports and social club. There is a pond on the common alongside Spook Hill.

The main estate in North Holmwood occupies the former site of Dorking Brickworks, which was a major local employer from the 1930s until its closure in 1983.  The brickworks used up the clay surrounding it, ran out of space in the 1950s and extended south of Inholms lane in 1961.  The clay supply was exhausted and the brickworks closed in 1983.  After demolition, the brickworks land north of Inholms lane was used to build residential housing, while the smaller excavation south of Inholms lane was designated a nature reserve, now the Inholms clay pit LNR, open to all and accessed by a tunnel under Inholms lane.

The parish church

A parish of Holmwood was created from parts of Dorking and Capel parishes in 1839. The parish church was built of flint in Early English style and consecrated in 1875. The tower contains two bells and a clock. The east window of the chancel has stained glass from 1874 made by Messrs Powell of White Friars. The west windows of the chancel have glass designed by Charles Eamer Kempe from 1891 showing the four Fathers of the Western Church.

Transport 
North Holmwood has two bus stops located either side of the newsagent's shop.

References

External links

Church website-history of parish
Sports and Social Club
History of Holmwood Common and the surrounding villages, eminent residents and key sites of architectural interest
Dorking Golf Club

Villages in Surrey
Mole Valley